Tales of the Walking Dead is an American post-apocalyptic horror drama anthology television series created by Scott M. Gimple and Channing Powell. The fourth television series within The Walking Dead franchise, it is a spin-off to The Walking Dead, which is based on the comic book series of the same name by Robert Kirkman, Tony Moore, and Charlie Adlard. Tales of the Walking Dead premiered on AMC on August 14, 2022.

Premise
Tales of the Walking Dead is an episodic anthology series that is based on new and existing characters within The Walking Dead universe.

Episodes

Production

Development
In September 2020, AMC announced they and Scott M. Gimple had been developing an episodic anthology series set within The Walking Dead universe. In October 2021, AMC officially greenlit a six-episode first season to debut in mid-2022. Channing Powell, who has written for both The Walking Dead and Fear the Walking Dead, serves as showrunner.

Casting
In February 2022, it was announced that Anthony Edwards, Parker Posey, Terry Crews, Poppy Liu, and Jillian Bell had been cast in starring roles. Daniella Pineda, Olivia Munn, Danny Ramirez, Loan Chabanol, Embeth Davidtz, Jessie T. Usher and Gage Munroe later joined the cast in undisclosed roles. In April 2022, it was confirmed that Samantha Morton would reprise her role as Alpha in an episode, and that Lauren Glazier and Matt Medrano had joined the cast.

Filming
Filming for the series began in January 2022 in Buford, Georgia, with the first episode directed by Michael E. Satrazemis; who has directed several episodes of both The Walking Dead and Fear the Walking Dead. In February 2022, it was confirmed that Satrazemis would direct three of the six first-season episodes, with the remaining episodes directed by Haifaa al-Mansour, Deborah Kampmeier, and Tara Nicole Weyr (who previously directed for Fear the Walking Dead). Later, it was revealed that Ron Underwood would be directing an episode, replacing Weyr. In April 2022, a crew member suffered an accidental injury on set, briefly suspending production. Filming for the season wrapped in April 2022.

Release

Broadcast
The series premiered on AMC on August 14, 2022. The first episode was released on August 11, on AMC+ and each subsequent episode is made available a week before their AMC air dates.

Marketing
A teaser trailer was released on April 10, 2022, using the tagline "6 Different Stories, 1 Dead World".

Critical reception
The review aggregator website Rotten Tomatoes reports a 74% approval rating with an average rating of 5.95/10, based on 29 critic reviews. The website's critics consensus reads, "While these Tales of the Walking Dead are shaggy dog stories of varying quality, there's still enough meat on the bone to justify this expansion of the long-running zombie saga." Metacritic, which uses a weighted average, assigned a score of 60 out of 100 based on 8 critics, indicating "mixed or average reviews".

References

External links
 
 

2020s American anthology television series
2020s American horror television series
2020s American drama television series
2022 American television series debuts
AMC (TV channel) original programming
American television spin-offs
English-language television shows
Horror drama television series
Post-apocalyptic television series
Television series based on Image Comics
Television shows filmed in Georgia (U.S. state)
The Walking Dead (franchise) television series
Zombies in television